The naked-eared deer mouse (Peromyscus gymnotis) is a species of rodent in the family Cricetidae. It is found in El Salvador, Guatemala, Honduras, Mexico, and Nicaragua.

References

Musser, G. G. and M. D. Carleton. (2005). Superfamily Muroidea. pp. 894–1531 in Mammal Species of the World a Taxonomic and Geographic Reference. D. E. Wilson and D. M. Reeder eds. Johns Hopkins University Press, Baltimore.

Peromyscus
Mammals described in 1894
Taxa named by Oldfield Thomas
Taxonomy articles created by Polbot